Carolyn Kieran is a Canadian mathematics educator known for her studies of how students learn algebra. She is a professor emerita of mathematics at the Université du Québec à Montréal.

Education and career
Kieran has bachelor's degrees from Marianopolis College and the Université de Montréal, a master's degree from Concordia University, and a doctorate from McGill University. She joined the mathematics department at the Université du Québec à Montréal in 1983 and became a full professor there in 1991. She retired in 2008 and was named a professor emerita in 2010.

Books
Kieran is a co-author, with J. Pang, D. Schifter, and S. F. Ng, of Early Algebra: Research into its Nature, its Learning, its Teaching (Springer Open, 2016).

She is a co-editor of volumes including:
Research Issues in the Learning and Teaching of Algebra, Vol. 4 (1989)
Selected Lectures from the Seventh International Congress on Mathematical Education (1994)
Approaches to Algebra: Perspectives for Research and Teaching
Computer Algebra Systems in Secondary School Mathematics Education (2003).

References

External links

Year of birth missing (living people)
Living people
Canadian mathematicians
Canadian women mathematicians
Université de Montréal alumni
Concordia University alumni
McGill University alumni
Academic staff of the Université du Québec à Montréal
}